Silvanus bidentatus, known generally as the flat bark beetle or two-toothed grain beetle, is a species of silvanid flat bark beetle in the family Silvanidae. It is found in North America, Oceania, and Europe.

References

Further reading

External links

 

Silvanidae
Articles created by Qbugbot
Beetles described in 1792